"Kol Ha'Olam Kulo" is a Hebrew language song by Orthodox Jewish rabbi Baruch Chait adapted from the epigram attributed to the Hasidic rabbi Nachman of Breslov, "The whole entire world is a very narrow bridge and the main thing is to have no fear at all". Israeli singer Ofra Haza also performs a popular version of the song.  The lyric is based on an excerpt from Likutei Moharan II #48.

The original text is slightly different from the words of the song. Reb Nachman wrote וְדַע, שֶׁהָאָדָם צָרִיךְ לַעֲבֹר עַל גֶּשֶׁר צַר מְאֹד 
מְאֹד, וְהַכְּלָל וְהָעִקָּר – שֶׁלֹּא יִתְפַּחֵד כְּלָל

"Know that a person needs to cross a very very narrow bridge, and what is essential is not to be afraid [or "... is that one should not be overcome by fear]."

References

Hebrew-language songs
Israeli songs